Junna Sakai (境 純菜 Sakai Junna, born November 2, 2000),  better known by her stage name JUNNA (じゅんな), is a Japanese singer managed by Cube Inc. and signed to FlyingDog.

Career 
JUNNA made her singing career debut as the singing voice of Mikumo Guynemer, the lead vocalist of the group Walküre from the anime Macross Δ. She was only 14 years old when she performed in the unit's digital single "Ikenai Borderline" released at the end of December 2015, making her the youngest singer to debut in the anime franchise's 35 year history.

In March 2017, her solo debut was decided and she performed a live tour in Tokyo, Nagoya and Osaka. Her first mini album "Vai! Ya! Vai!" was released in June 2017.

In 2017, she performed "Here", the first opening theme song for the anime The Ancient Magus' Bride. The single for "Here" was released in November 2017.

In 2018, she performed a second live tour in Sendai, Tokyo, Osaka, and Nagoya. The tour was done to celebrate the release of her first single. During the tour, she also announced that a second single, which would include the ending theme song for the Lord of Vermilion anime, was to be released in July.

In 2019, she performed "Kono Yubi Tomare", a theme song for the second season anime of Kakegurui.

In 2021, she performed "Umi to Shinju", the opening theme song for the anime Fena: Pirate Princess.

Discography

Albums 
 [2018.10.31] 17 Sai ga Utsukushi Nante, Dare ga Itta
 [2020.12.09] 20x20

Mini albums 
 [2017.6.21] Vai! Ya! Vai!

Singles 
 [2017.11.01] Here
 [2018.07.18] Akaku Zetsubou no Hana
 [2019.01.23] Kono Yubi Tomare
 [2019.07.24] Iru Imi
 [2021.10.06] Umi to Shinjuu
 [2022.02.16] Kazenootosae kikoenai

Digital singles 
 [2021.12.22] the route of the sun
 [2022.08.05] Aimai na Futari (曖昧な2人)

Walküre

Digital singles 

 [2015.12.31] Ikenai Borderline (いけないボーダーライン)
 [2016.03.01] Koi! Halation THE WAR (恋! ハレイション THE WAR)

Singles
 [2016.05.11] Ichido Dake no Koi Nara / Rune ga Pikatto Hikattara (一度だけの恋なら / ルンがピカッと光ったら)
 [2016.08.10] Zettai Reido θ Novatic / Hametsu no Junjou (絶対零度θノヴァティック / 破滅の純情)
 [2017.01.25] Walküre ga Tomaranai (ワルキューレがとまらない)
 [2018.02.14] Walküre ga Uragiranai (ワルキューレは裏切らない)

Studio albums
 [2016.07.06] Walküre Attack!
 [2016.09.28] Walküre Trap!
 [2021.10.13] Walküre Reborn!

Mini albums
 [2017.01.25] Walküre ga Tomaranai!

Live albums
 [2017.05.31] Walküre LIVE 2017 "Walküre ga Tomaranai" at Yokohama Arena (ワルキューレ LIVE 2017"ワルキューレがとまらない" at 横浜アリーナ)

References

External links 
 

21st-century Japanese women singers
21st-century Japanese singers
2000 births
Living people